The Metro Mondego, part of the mass transit public transport system of Coimbra, Portugal, was to have been a light-rail network that runs above ground in Coimbra into the city's suburbs. Studies and planning were in progress but the Metro Mondego project was cancelled in January 2011 at the height of Portuguese financial crisis. The operational conventional rail line connecting the municipalities of: Coimbra, Miranda do Corvo, Lousã, and Serpins was closed at the same time and replaced by a bus service.

A major part of the plan was to rejoin the isolated section of rail line between the stations of Coimbra - Parque and Serpins to the rest of the rail network at Coimbra and Coimbra - B station. This would have involved street running along Avenida Ermidio Navarro and Avenida da Lousã between the two existing stations of Coimbra and Coimbra - Parque.

There was a single un-electrified track along that street section used once a day for a scheduled train. It was also used to transfer rolling stock to and from the Coimbra - Parque station. Travelling north, the trains ran in the opposite direction to road traffic along a one-way street. The track embedded in the street is still intact; however, the Coimbra-Parque station was demolished in March 2022, and by that time, the rails in the other sections of the track had been lifted.

There is some local agitation to have the Serpins aspect of the project restarted as there is dissatisfication with the replacement bus service; current plans see the replacement of the railway with a bus rapid transit service,

Stations
The system would have had two lines with several stations:
Line A: Coimbra-B - Hospital
Line B: Coimbra-B - Serpins along the line of the old railway.

Line A
Coimbra B (train connections to Porto, Lisbon, Guarda, Figueira da Foz)
Açude
Inês de Castro
Aeminium
Arnado
Câmara (City Hall)
Mercado
Praça da República
Universidade (University)
Sereia  (Parque de Santa Cruz) 
Celas
Hospital

Line B
Coimbra B
Açude
Inês de Castro
Aeminium
Portagem
Parque (near Mondego River)
Rainha Santa
Arregaça
Norton Matos
São José
Solum  (near Estádio Cidade de Coimbra)
Vale das Flores
Carvalhosas
Quinta da Fonte
Conraria
Ceira
Vale de Açor
Tremoa
Moinhos
Lobazes
Miranda do Corvo
Corvo
Padrão
Meiral
Lousã - A
Lousã
Espirito Santo
Serpins

External links
metromondego.pt - official site

Buildings and structures in Coimbra
Light rail in Portugal